Marc Aristide Rieffel is a mathematician noted for his fundamental contributions to C*-algebra and quantum group theory. He is currently a professor in the department of mathematics at the University of California, Berkeley.

In 2012, he was selected as one of the inaugural fellows of the American Mathematical Society.

Contributions 
Rieffel earned his doctorate from Columbia University in 1963 under Richard Kadison with a dissertation entitled A Characterization of Commutative Group Algebras and Measure Algebras.

Rieffel introduced Morita equivalence as a fundamental notion in noncommutative geometry and as a tool for classifying C*-algebras. For example, in 1981 he showed that if Aθ denotes the noncommutative torus of angle θ, then Aθ and Aη are Morita equivalent if and only if θ and η lie in the same orbit of the action of SL(2, Z) on R by fractional linear transformations. More recently, Rieffel has introduced a noncommutative analogue of Gromov-Hausdorff convergence for compact metric spaces which is motivated by applications to string theory.

References

External links

Living people
20th-century American mathematicians
21st-century American mathematicians
Columbia University alumni
Fellows of the American Mathematical Society
University of California, Berkeley faculty
1937 births